Héctor Verdés Ortega (born 24 June 1984) is a Spanish professional footballer who plays as a central defender.

Club career
Born in Villar del Arzobispo, Valencian Community, Verdés was a product of Valencia CF's youth system. After unsuccessfully appearing for them as a senior (never made it past the reserves in three full seasons), he served a loan with Xerez CD in the Segunda División, appearing in exactly half of the matches as the Andalusians finished in 15th position. In summer 2008, he was released by his parent club.

For the 2008–09 campaign, Verdés moved to the Segunda División B, playing under young manager Luis Enrique at FC Barcelona B. He returned to Valencia after only one year, spending an additional season with the reserve side – also in division three – which ended in relegation.

Verdés signed for Elche CF, also in his native region and the second division, in July 2010. After three seasons of irregular playing time, featuring in 24 games in the first one and just 21 in the following two, mainly due to injuries, he moved to fellow league team AD Alcorcón.

On 29 June 2015, Verdés signed a two-year deal with Real Oviedo, newly promoted to the second tier. On 20 July 2018, he joined CF Rayo Majadahonda from the same league after cutting ties with his previous club.

After suffering relegation, Verdés moved to CD Castellón of the third division on 18 July 2019.

References

External links

CiberChe biography and stats 

1984 births
Living people
Sportspeople from the Province of Valencia
Spanish footballers
Footballers from the Valencian Community
Association football defenders
Segunda División players
Segunda División B players
Tercera División players
Valencia CF Mestalla footballers
Xerez CD footballers
FC Barcelona Atlètic players
Elche CF players
AD Alcorcón footballers
Real Oviedo players
CF Rayo Majadahonda players
CD Castellón footballers